Abrisham (also Romanized as Abrīsham; also known as Bāgh Abrīsham and Bāgh-e Abrīsham)  is a city in the Central District of Falavarjan County, Isfahan Province, Iran.  At the 2006 census, its population was 19,406, in 5,324 families.

In Persian, "Abrisham" means silk.

For its public transit system, the city is served by Falavarjan County Municipalities Mass Transit Organization bus network route 4 and Isfahan and Suburbs Bus Company bus network route 104.

References

Populated places in Falavarjan County

Cities in Isfahan Province